Bottomless pit may refer to:

 Bottomless pit (Bible), a place where demons are imprisoned
 Bottomless Pit (band), an indie rock band from Chicago, Illinois
 Bottomless Pit (album), a 2016 album by Death Grips
 Bottomless pit (video gaming), a level hazard in video games
 "Bottomless Pit!", an episode of Gravity Falls

See also
 
 Abyss (disambiguation)
 Pit (disambiguation)